Ye-U District is a district in Sagaing Region of Myanmar. Its administrative center is the city of Ye-U.

Townships
The district consists of the following townships:
Ye-U Township
Ye-U
Taze Township
Taze
Tabayin Township
Tabayin
Saing Pyin

Notes

Districts of Myanmar
Sagaing Region